The Le Pavillon Hotel is a historic hotel in New Orleans, Louisiana.

History
The hotel opened in 1907 as the New Denechaud Hotel. It was renamed the DeSoto Hotel in 1913 and then the Le Pavillon Hotel in 1971.

Le Pavillon Hotel was placed on the National Register of Historic Places by the U.S. Department of the Interior in 1991. Le Pavillon Hotel is a member of Historic Hotels of America, the official program of the National Trust for Historic Preservation.

References

Hotels in New Orleans
Hotels established in 1907
Hotel buildings completed in 1907
1907 establishments in Louisiana
Historic Hotels of America